Benjamin Conley (March 1, 1815 – January 10, 1886) was an American politician from the state of Georgia, who served as the 47th Governor of Georgia from October 30, 1871, to January 12, 1872. He also previously served as the mayor of Augusta from 1857 to 1859.

Biography
Conley was born in Newark, New Jersey, in 1815 and moved to Savannah, Georgia, in his youth. He died in 1886 in Atlanta in an area known at the time as West End. Conley was buried at Augusta's Magnolia Cemetery.

Political career
Conley's previous political service included the office of mayor of Augusta, Georgia, from 1857 to 1859. Conley served as the 47th Governor of Georgia from October 30, 1871, to January 12, 1872, during Reconstruction and was the second Republican governor of Georgia. Conley was serving as the president of the Georgia Senate when his predecessor, Rufus B. Bullock, was forced to resign.  Under the Constitution of Georgia in effect at that time, as the Senate president, Conley assumed the governorship and served for only two months. Conley was the last Republican to serve as governor of Georgia until 2002, when Sonny Perdue was elected.

References 

 Georgia State Archives Roster of State Governors
 Georgia Governor's Gravesites Field Guide (1776–2003)

External links 
 Benjamin Conley entry at the National Governors Association
 Benjamin Conley entry at The Political Graveyard
 

1815 births
1886 deaths
Republican Party Georgia (U.S. state) state senators
Republican Party governors of Georgia (U.S. state)
Mayors of Augusta, Georgia
Politicians from Newark, New Jersey
Politicians from Savannah, Georgia
19th-century American politicians